The Who I Am Tour was the first headlining concert tour by American band Nick Jonas & the Administration, showcasing their debut album, Who I Am. The tour took place in small, intimate venues around the United States.  The tour kicked began and ended in January 2010.

On February 4, 2010 reported totals from eight venues placed the band in fifth for Billboard's Hot Tours of the week grossing $1,065,479.

Support act

Forever Seven (January 8 only)
The Rule (January 21 only)

Surprise guests
Joe Jonas – (January 8 during Please Be Mine, January 29 during LoveBug and Who I Am)
Kevin Jonas – (January 8 during Please Be Mine, January 29 during LoveBug and Who I Am)
Travis Clark of We The Kings – (January 13 during "Don't Wait Up" with support act Diane Birch)
Frankie Jonas – (January 29 during  "Lovebug")

Set list

Other songs
In addition to the regular set list the band played other songs, including a variety of covers, that were only performed on certain dates:

Tour dates

Cancellations and rescheduled shows

References

2010 concert tours
Nick Jonas & the Administration concert tours